Chrzanów is a town in Lesser Poland Voivodeship (S Poland).

Chrzanów may also refer to:

Chrzanów, Lower Silesian Voivodeship (south-west Poland)
Chrzanów, Lublin Voivodeship (east Poland)
Chrzanów, Świętokrzyskie Voivodeship (south-central Poland)